Alvin Ira Malnik (born May 23, 1933) is an American businessman and attorney.

Biography
Malnik was born May 23, 1933, to a working-class family in St. Louis, Missouri, the son of Russian-Jewish immigrants. He studied at Clark Elementary school in childhood and graduated from Soldan High School in 1950.

He received his Bachelor of Arts degree from Washington University in St. Louis in 1954. He was in the U.S. Army Reserve from 1954 to 1956 as a Guided Missile Officer and received the rank of Reserve Captain.

He received his LLB and J.D. degrees from the University of Miami School of Law in 1959 and joined the Florida Bar. In the late 1960s, he was actively involved in the practice of law, and in the subsequent years, was engaged in the development of real estate as well as the finance business.

Early in his career, Malnik bought and sold the rights to the movie-machine, "Scopitone."  The $2 million profit from this business deal made Malnik a millionaire and introduced him to the entertainment world.  From this venture, Malnik developed long-lasting business and personal relationships with several "Rat Pack" celebrities including Frank Sinatra and Dean Martin. Film maker Brett Ratner told Aventura Business Monthly in a May 2011, cover story interview that he "really didn't know" his biological father, and that he considers Alvin Malnik to be his dad, "the one who raised" him.

Al Malnik is a founder of such institutions as the University of Miami/Sylvester Comprehensive Cancer Center and Mount Sinai Medical Center and is a sponsor of the Founders Society of the University of Miami as well as Al & Nancy Malnik Family AML Research Fund. He received several honors issued by the following establishments:

·       Dana Farber Cancer Institute

·       Miami Beach Chamber of Commerce

·       Jay Weiss Research Center at the University of Miami, School of Medicine

·       The Make a Wish Foundation

The Forge
Malnik and his friend Jay Weiss purchased and remodeled The Forge restaurant in Miami Beach in 1968. The restaurant is known to be the 2nd oldest restaurant in South Florida. “The Forge Restaurant” is one of the flagship restaurants in the U.S. that received the International Grand Master Wine Award. The Wine Spectator Magazine has called it the ‘#1 Restaurant in America’. The restaurant is currently managed by Alvin's son, Shareef, who continues to maintain the prominence and success of the family business.

Real Estate Projects   
Under the guidance and sponsorship of Al Malnik, such real estate projects were developed and built as Cricket Club Condominium buildings, Sky Lake Country Club, Brandsmart Building, California Club Residents as well as multiple shopping centers in South Florida.

Personal life
His first wife was Deborah "Debbie" Carol (née Froelich) Malnick Hopp with whom he had four children before divorcing. In 1995, he married Nancy Gresham with whom he has six children, including his daughter, Spencer. His son, Mark "Shareef" Malnik, is married to Gabrielle Anwar.

References

External links
Official website

1933 births
Living people
American people of Russian-Jewish descent
Businesspeople from Missouri
Jewish American philanthropists
Missouri lawyers
21st-century American Jews
University of Miami School of Law alumni
Washington University in St. Louis alumni